Tapas is a 2005 comedy film written and directed by  and Juan Cruz.

Plot
The film centers on a Spanish tapas bar and the love lives of the loosely interconnected people in the neighborhood surrounding the bar.  The pairs of lovers include a middle aged woman and a young man; an elderly, drug dealing woman and her terminally ill husband in poor health; the tapas bar owner and his estranged wife; and two Chinese immigrants.

Cast

Production 
A Spanish-Argentine-Mexican co-production, the film was produced by Castelao Productions and Tusitala PC.

Release 
Tapas was presented at the Málaga Film Festival in April 2005. It was theatrically released in Spain on 13 May 2005.

Accolades 

|-
| align = "center" rowspan = "3" | 2005 || rowspan = "3" | 8th Málaga Film Festival || colspan = "2" | Golden Biznaga ||  || rowspan = "3" | 
|-
| Best Actress || Elvira Mínguez || 
|-
| colspan = "2" | Audience Award || 
|-
| rowspan = "4" align = "center" | 2006 || rowspan = "2" | 20th Goya Awards || Best New Director || José Corbacho, Juan Cruz ||  || rowspan = "2" | 
|-
| Best Supporting Actress || Elvira Mínguez || 
|-
| 15th Actors and Actresses Union Awards || Best Film Actress in a Secondary Role || Elvira Mínguez ||  || 
|-
| 1st Sur Awards || Best Supporting Actor || Eduardo de Mendoza ||  || 
|-
| align = "center" | 2007 || 55th Silver Condor Awards || colspan = "2" | Best Ibero-American Film ||  || 
|}

See also 
 List of Spanish films of 2005

References

External links 
 

2005 films
2000s Spanish-language films
2005 comedy-drama films
2005 directorial debut films
2005 comedy films
2005 drama films
Spanish comedy-drama films
Argentine comedy-drama films
2000s Spanish films
2000s Argentine films
Films shot in the province of Barcelona
Castelao Producciones films